Overijse is a municipality in the province of Flemish Brabant, in Flanders, Belgium. It is a suburb of the wider Brussels metropolitan area. The municipality comprises the town of Overijse, and the communities of Eizer, Maleizen, Jezus-Eik, Tombeek and Terlanen. On December 31, 2008, Overijse had a total population of 24,410. The total area is 44.43 km² which gives a population density of 549 inhabitants per km².
Overijse is surrounded by an extensive woodlands (Zoniënwoud/Forêt de Soignes), with paths for walking and cycling.

The official language is Dutch. French-speaking residents who have migrated mainly from Wallonia or Brussels are represented by 8 members on the 27-seat local council. According to the 2008 census, Overijse was also home to 4,842 expatriates including 1,236 Dutch, 766 British, 505 Germans, 375 Americans, 311 French and 295 Italian.

Near Overijse there is a medium wave transmitter for the Belgian foreign radio service. Overijse has a traditional festival every year, held in August (Druivenfeesten). The festival commemorates the industry that shaped the area, namely cultivation of grapes (Dutch druiven). In 2010 it is held from August 21–28.  The Druivenkoers Overijse is a single-day road bicycle race during the festival.  The Vlaamse Druivencross is a December cyclo-cross classic race.

In 1952, Albert Lootvoet, a local brewer started brewing Leffe beer. The Leffe beers were brewed in Overijse from 1952 until 1977, when the Artois breweries bought out the local brewer.

History of Overijse 
Overijse draws its name from the nearby river, the IJse, that flows through the region. The oldest known name is  Isca; the word is likely Celtic in origin, and translated means 'Water'. Overijse was the birthplace of the 16th century humanist Justus Lipsius, a professor at Leuven who was friend of the printer and publisher Plantin.

Attractions
Historical sites include:
 The Late Gothic Sint Martinus Church with ship (1489), the choir (1520), and quasi Romanesque towers from the (12th century).
 Castle of the IJse (17th century) with a (16th century) facade and a 15th-century hunting pavilion; against the castle walls Kellebron from the 13th century.
 Townhouse (1503–1505), restored in 1963.
 By the beguinage (1264) a 15th-century Gothic castle.
 In the village of Tombeek, the (16th century) castle Bisdom with 12th-century towers.
 Also in Tombeek, the Sanatorium Joseph Lemaire (1937), a modern building from architect Maxime Brunfaut.
 In the village of Jezus-Eik, the Baroque Onze Lieve Vrouwekerk (Our Beloved Lady Church) with a choir from (1650) and a ship from 1667, restored in 2007.

Twin towns
 Lecco, Lecco, Lombardy, Italy
 Bruttig-Fankel, Rhineland-Palatinate, Germany
 Bacharach, Rhineland-Palatinate, Germany
 Mâcon, Saône-et-Loire, Bourgogne-Franche-Comté, France
 Modra, Slovakia

References

External links

Official website - Only available in Dutch

 
Municipalities of Flemish Brabant